Marayong is a suburb of Sydney, in the state of New South Wales, Australia. Marayong is located approximately 38 kilometres north west of the Sydney central business district, in the local government area of the City of Blacktown and is part of the Greater Western Sydney region.

History
Marayong is derived from an Aboriginal word 'Mariyung' meaning emu or place of cranes. The name was first given by the New South Wales Railways to the railway station when it opened in October 1922.

Around 1900–1905, large areas were subdivided and market gardens and poultry farms were established. The area was part of Quakers Hill but in 1926 the Marayong Progress Association applied to have Marayong made a suburb, in its own right.

The area was mostly rural until the 1960s. Housing Commission (public housing) estates, opened in the 1960s, marked the urbanization of the suburb predominantly south of the railway line. In addition, an industrial area was also released north of the railway line.

Population
The population of Marayong was 6821 at the 2006 census. The median household income of $993 per week was a bit less than the national average and there were a higher than average number of clerical and administrative workers (18.4%) and technicians and tradesworkers (16.4%). There were a substantial number of people born in the Philippines (6.5%) and the number of Catholics in Marayong (40.6%) was well above the national average.

Transport

Marayong railway station is on the Richmond branch of the T1 Western and T5 Cumberland lines of the Sydney Trains network. The provide services out to Richmond and in to the city via Blacktown and Parramatta. 

Years ago, Motor Rail No. 1 would run between Blacktown stopping at Marayong Station en route.

Richmond Road marks the southern boundary of the suburb and provides links to Blacktown and Richmond while the Westlink M7 curls around the suburb and can be accessed via the Sunnyholt Road intersection at Kings Park or the Richmond Road intersection at Dean Park.

Schools
There are two government-run primary schools in the suburb, Marayong Public and Marayong Heights Public. There is also a Catholic primary school, St Andrews Primary and a high school St Andrews College which is divided into two campuses, the Holy Family campus on Quakers Road catering to years 7-10 and the John Paul II senior campus on Breakfast Road. The nearest government-run high schools are Quakers Hill High School, Blacktown Boys High School, Blacktown Girls High School and Doonside Technology High School.

References

Suburbs of Sydney
City of Blacktown